Myx Awards 2021 is the 16th installment of the Myx Music Awards, acknowledging the biggest hit makers of 2020 in the Philippine music industry. The awards were held virtually for the second time (since 2020) due to the ongoing coronavirus pandemic.

Nominees were announced on June 19, 2021 through the music channel's digital accounts on Kumu, Twitter, Facebook, TikTok, and YouTube livestream. Ben&Ben led the nominees with five nominations, Moira Dela Torre with four, and SB19 with three. For the tenth consecutive year, fans are voting online through the Myx website. Apart from online voting, fans can also vote through Kumu and Twitter. Voting ended on July 18.

Winners and nominees
Winners are listed first and highlighted in boldface.

Multiple awards

Artists with multiple wins
The following artists received two or more awards:

Artists with multiple nominations
The following artists received more than two nominations:

References

External links
 MYX Official Site

Myx Music Awards
2021 music awards
Philippine music awards
2021 in Philippine music